Hanna Serhiivna Pysmenska (born March 12, 1991) is a Ukrainian diver.

Career
Competing as a pair with Mariya Voloshchenko, they finished seventh with in the synchronized 3 metre springboard event of the 2008 Olympic Games, and she also finished in 26th in the 3 metre springboard event. At the 2012 Summer Olympics, she competed in the same events, finishing in sixth in the synchronised 3 metre springboard event with Olena Fedorova and in 21st in the individual event.  She is also a European champion (3m springboard at the 2017 European Championships) and multiple medallist.  She began diving at the age of 5 and made her international debut in 2007.  In 2019, she suffered a severe shoulder injury, missing out on six months of training time.

References

1991 births
Living people
Sportspeople from Vinnytsia
Ukrainian female divers
Divers at the 2008 Summer Olympics
Divers at the 2012 Summer Olympics
Olympic divers of Ukraine
Universiade medalists in diving
Universiade silver medalists for Ukraine
Medalists at the 2011 Summer Universiade
Divers at the 2020 Summer Olympics
21st-century Ukrainian women